Nematopsis (Nee-mah-top-cis) is a genus gregarine Apicomplexan of the family Porosporidae. It is an aquatic parasite of crustaceans with a molluscan intermediate host. Nematopsis has been distinguished from the similar genus Porospora by its resistant and encapsulated oocyst (Leger and Dubosq 1925). Little molecular biology has been performed on the members of the Nemaptosis and species are described based on molluscan and crustacean hosts as well as oocyst structure. A total of 38 species have been described and are found all over the world (United States, India, Brazil, Spain, Thailand and other coastal regions) (Sprague & Orr 1955, Suja et al. 2016, Tuntiwaranuruk et al. 2008, Soto et al. 1996, Brito et al. 2010) .

Etymology 
The genus name Nematopsis is derived from the worm resembling sporozoite. Nematopsis: “resembling a nematode” (Lauckner 1983).

History of knowledge 
Nematopsis was first described by A. Schneider in France in 1892 (Schneider 1892). Due to N. portunidarum’s (previously known as N. schneideri) ovoid oocysts, Schneider initially assigned the species to the Coccidia (Solter et al. 2012). However, in 1903 Leger found similar spores in mussels and proposed the name Nematopsis schneider. These spores germinated into vermiform sporozoites resembling small nematode worms, hence the name Nematopsis. In 1911 Leger and Dubosq proposed the new name Porospora portunidarum after the same spores hatched in the crab Portunus and developed into a gregarine. However in 1931 Hatt changed the classification back to Nematopsis after observing its resistant monozoic spores; he renamed it Nematopsis portunidarum.  After Nematopsis’ initial discovery in 1892, Schneider also named another genus, Porospora, in 1875. These two genera make up the family Porosporidae Labbe 1899 (Azevedo & Matos 1999). For many years following the discovery of these two genera, their taxonomic differences were unclear and confusing (Azevedo & Matos 1999). Their taxonomic differences became clear with the description of their sporozoite morphologies (Lauckner 1983). Members of the genus Porospora have naked sporozoites, enclosed by the hosts cell, whereas species of the genus Nematopsis have sporozoites enclosed in thick hyaline walls. The Nematopsis spores were found to occur in mollusc tissue (Lauckner 1983).

The life cycle of Nematopsis was described by H. Prytherch in 1938 and again in more detail in 1940 (Prytherch 1938, 1940). This description was used as criteria on which to assign species to the genus. Most species where described after 1938.

In 1938, Ball described the genus Carcinoecetes, a parasite of crabs which was initially thought to be related to the family Prosporidae (Ball 1938). However, members of Carcinoecetes are now accepted as belonging to either Nematopsis or Cephaloidophora. Three previously described Carcinoecetes species are now considered Nematopsis: N. calappae, N. Hesperus and N. matutae.

Habitat and ecology 
Nematopsis is a marine parasite which utilizes marine bivalves as intermediate hosts (Kim et al. 2006). They have been found all over the world; including United States, India, Thailand, Spain, Brazil and other coastal regions (Sprague & Orr 1955, Suja et al. 2016, Tuntiwaranuruk et al. 2008, Soto et al. 1996, Brito et al. 2010) Different species of Nematopsis have preferences for different host species and tissue type (Sprague and Orr 1952). The primary host of Nematopsis are the mud and stone crabs, (Prytherch 1940). The degree to which Nematopsis parasitism damages its host is dependent on the severity of  infection. Histological examination of Indian oysters, Crassostrea madasensis, demonstrated hypertrophy of infected cells, leading to mechanical interference of physiological processes such as feeding and gas exchange (Suja et al. 2016). . However, infected hosts did not mount immune responses to Nematopsis infection (Suja et al. 2016). The study also suggests that at a low levels of infection the host's would not be damaged by the parasitism (Suja et al. 2016). One study from Brazil found that 100% of cultivated oysters, Crassostrea rhizopjorae, were infected by Nematopsis sp.. The study suggested that infection led to lesions and tissue destruction in the oysters (Brito et al. 2010). How Nematopsis can infect molluscan populations through intra- and interspecific spread in not known. Once Nematopsis moves to its secondary crustacean host, its effect is relatively understudied. Nematopsis infection in molluscs has been found to have seasonality and temperature dependence (Gutierrez-Salazar et al. 2011). Gutierrez- Salazar et al. (2011) suggest that Nematopsis sp. was most prevalent in morning and evening temperatures. Due to the endo-parasitic nature of Nematopsis other factors such as water quality and presence of bacteria did not influence its abundance (Gutierrez-Salazar et al. 2011).

Description

Morphology and anatomy 
In general, adult extracellular Nematopsis (sporadins) are milky-white in color, and associate as groups of two caudo-frontally, with one cell's anterior side contacting the other's posterior (Prasadan and Janardana, 2001). The two cells are associated linearly and range from around 150-200 μm in length (Prasadan and Janardana 2001). Nuclei are generally spherical to ovoid and each associated cell possesses a single nucleus (Prasadan and Janardana 2001).  Apicomplexan parasites such as Nematopsis have specialized organelles called rhoptries. These are unique secretory organelles that store phospholipids and cholesterol and are used for rapid mitotic events needed for dispersal of infectious cells (Coppens 2005).

The gametocyst of Nematopsis, the cyst in which gametes are produced in gregarines, is spherical and around 110-160 μm in diameter (Prasadan and Janardana 2001). They are generally found in close contact with host tissue (gastro-intestinal tract, gills or mantle) (Prasadan and Janardana 2001). The surface of the gametocyst is wrinkled and has a central pore at one pole. Inside the gametocytes are many gymnospores and membranous sacs. The gymnospores are composed of many radially arranged, cone-shaped sporozoites, the infective agent that infects a target host (Galinski and Barnwell 2012). At the sporozoite rostral end there is an oval nucleus, rough endoplasmic reticulum, mitochondria and secretory granules (Tuntuwaranuruk et al.  2015).

The oocyst of Nematopsis contains a single uni-nucleated vermiform sporozoite (Prasadan and Janardana 2001). It is ellipsoidal in shape and found along myofibrils of host tissue (Abdel-Baki et al. 2012). The oocysts is encapsulate in a thick hyaline wall (Abdel-Baki et al. 2012). The oocyst is resistant to destruction within the host due to its thick protective wall (Clopton 2002).

Life cycle

Crustacean Host 
Nematopsis undergoes growth, gametogenesis, sexual recombination, and zygote formation in its crustacean host (i.e. crab) and produces gymnospores that go on to infect molluscan hosts (Clopton 2002). The crustacean becomes infected after ingesting an oocyst (Clopton 2002). Once ingested sporozoites migrate to the intestine, attach to epithelial cells and grow, growth to maturity takes around 14–21 days (Clopton 2002). Mature cells then associate to form sporadins and migrate to the crustacean's rectum, where they reproduce and form gametocysts (Clopton 2002). Zygotes divide to form sporozoites within the gametocysts, forming the gymnospores, the gametocyst ruptures and releases gymnospores through the crabs anus into the surrounding water (Clopton 2002).

Intermediate molluscan host 
Once feeding currents cause Nematopsis to enter its molluscan host, gymnospores first attach to the mollusc's gill or mantle depending on the species and penetrate the epithelium (Clopton 2002). They are then engulfed by the host's leukocytes and undergo presporonic growth (Clopton 2002). Once mature each sporozoite forms a resistant oocyst, which can be ingested by a crustacean host (Clopton 2002). Some Nematopsis species may from “heliospores” (bundles of female and male gametes) which are then transmitted to molluscs and form naked zygotes (Hatt 1931).

Genetics 
Little genetic material of Nematopsis has been sequences. Ribosomal RNA of Nematopsis temporariae was sequenced to show its parasitic relationship to tadpoles (Chambouvet et al. 2016).

Practical importance 
As Nematopsis infects molluscs and crustaceans, it has strong effects on aquaculture. Recent studies have been conducted to investigate the role of Nematopsis as a parasite in commercially valuable marine organisms, in particular bivalves and crustaceans. Gregarine disease of penaeid shrimp is a common disease caused by Nematopsis spp. that affects shrimp in the United States, France, and India (Fisheries and Oceans Canada 1996). Due to parasite attachment in the crustaceans gut lumen, reduced absorption of food and intestinal blockages can occur in the host (Fisheries and Oceans Canada 1996. Although this has been thought to have little pathological significance for the host, severe infections can lead to low host survival and decreased shrimp output from the cultivation facility (Lightner 1996). Similarly to crustacean, molluscs with severe Nematopsis infections can develop lesions and hypertrophy which can lead to mechanical deformations inhibiting feeding and gas exchange, again resulting in poor quality shellfish and lower yields (Suja et al. 2016). Although Nematopsis infection may not always be severe, it is clear that it can affect aquaculture practice of both wild and cultured organisms and it is important to understand what influences the occurrence of Nematopsis infection and its severity. Better understanding of Nematopsis infection in commercially valuable species will lead to better management programs and optimization of quality and quantity of the desired aquaculture product.

Species list 
Species are classified based on their host and oocyst morphology, little molecular data exists on the genus. 

(Jimenez et al. 2002, Lauckner 1983, Sprague 1971)

References 

 Abdel-Bake, A. et al. 2012. Ultrastructural characteristics of Nematopsis sp. oocysts (Apicomplexa: Porosporidae), a parasite of the clam Meretrix meretrix (Veneridae) from the Persian Gulf, Saudi Arabia. Parasitologica. 59(2): 81-86. 
 Azevedo, C. & Matos, E. 1999. Description of Nematopsis mytella n. sp. (Apicomplexa), parasite of the mussel Mytella guyanensis (Mytelidae) from the Amazon estuary and description of its oocysts. Euro J or Protistology. 35(4): 427-433. .
 Ball, G. H. 1938 The life history of Carcinoecetes hesperus, n. gen., n. sp., a gregarine parasite of the striped shore crab Pachygrapsus crassipes, with observations on related forms. Arch. Protistenk. 90: 299-319.
 Brito, L.O. et al. 2010. Presence of Nematopsis sp. (Protozoa, Apicomplexa) in the oyster, Crassostrea rhizophorae (Guilding, 1828), cultivated in the state of Pernambuco, Brazil. World Aquaculture. 41(1): 60-62.
 Chambouvet, A. et al. 2016 Nematopsis temporariae is an intracellular infectious agent of tadpole livers. Environmental microbiology. 8(5): 675-679. .
 Clopton, R. E. 2002. Phylum Apicomplexa Levine, 1970: Order Eugregarinorida Léger, 1900. Pages 205-288 in: Illustrated Guide to the Protozoa, 2nd edition, J. J. Lee, G. Leedale, D. Patterson, and P. C. Bradbury, eds. Society of Protozoologists, Lawrence, Kansas.
 Coppens, I. & Vielemeyer, O. 2005. Insights into unique physiological features of neutral lipids in Apicomplexa: from storage to potential mediation in parasite metabolic activities. Int J Parasitology. 35(6): 597 -615. 
 Fisheries and Oceans Canada. Gregarine Disease of Penaeid Shrimp. 1996. Accessed from: http://www.dfo-mpo.gc.ca/science/aah-saa/diseases-maladies/gregdpsp-eng.html
 Galinski, M.R. & Barnwell, J.W. 2012. “Nonhuman Primates in Biomedical Research (Second Edition)”. Nonhuman Primate Models for Human Malaria Research. 
 Gutierrez-Salazar, G.J. et al. 2011. Pathogens in Pacific white shrimp (Litopenaeus vannamei Boone, 1931) and their relationship with physicochemical parameters in three different culture systems in Tamaulipas, Mexico. Aquaculture. 321: 34-40.
 Hatt, P. 1931. L’évolution des Poosporides chez les Mollusques. Archive Zoologica Experiments Génerale. 72: 341-415.
 Jimenez, R., De Barniol, L., & Machuca, M. (2002). Nematopsis marinus n. sp., a new septate gregarine from cultured penaeoid shrimp Litopenaeus vannamei (Boone), in Ecuador. Aquaculture Research. 33(4): 231-240. 
 Kim, Y., Ashton-Alcox, K.A., Powell, E.N. 2006. Histological techniques for marine bivalve molluscs: Update. Retrieved from: http://aquaticcommons.org/14947/1/histopathtechmemofinal.pdf
 Lauckner, G. 1983. “Disease of mollusca: bivalvia.” Diseases of marine animals. 2. Retrieved from: https://www.intres.com/archive/doma_books/DOMA_Vol_II_(bivalvia_to_arthropoda).pdf
 Léger L. 1903. Sporozoaire parasite des moules et autres lamellibranche comestible. C R Acedemy Scientifique. 137: 1003-1006. 
 Léger L. & Duboscq O. 1911. Deux Grégarines de custacés Prospora portunidarum Frenz. et Cephaloidophora maculate n. sp. Archive Zoologica Experiments Génerale. 6: 49-60.
 Parasadan, P. & Janardanan, K. 2001. Three New Species of Gregarines (Apicomplexa: Sporozoea: Porosporidae) in the Estuarine Crabs from Kerala, India. Protozoologica. 40: 303-309. 
 Prytherch, H.F. 1938. Life-Cycle of a Sporozoan Parasite of the Oyster. Science. 88: 451-452. Retrieved from: https://www.jstor.org/stable/1663657
 Prytherch, H.F. 1940. The life cycle and morphology of the Nematopsis ostrearum, sp. Nov. a gregarine parasite of the mud cab and oyster. 
 Soto, M. et al. 1996. Nematopsis spp. Schneider, 1892 (Apicomplexa: Gregarinida) in bivalve molluscs off Ria de Vigo (Galicia, NW Spain). Bulletin-European Association of Fish Pathologists. 165): 157-160.
 Sprague V. & Orr, P.E. 1955. Nematopsis ostrearum and N. prytherchi with special reference to the host-parasite relations. Parasitology. 41(1): 89-104. 
 Sprague V. & Couch, J. 1971. An Annotated List of Protozoan Parasites, Hyperparasites, and Commensals of Decapod Crustacea. Protozool. 18(3): 526-537.
 Suja, G. et al. 2016. Nematopsis sp. (Apicomplexa: Porosporidae) infection in Crassostrea madrasensis and its associated histopathology. MBAI. 58(1): 1890-1904. 
 Tuntiwaranuruk, C. et al. 2008. Infection of Nematopsis oocysts in different size classes of the farmed mussel Perna viridis in Thailand. Aquaculture, 281: 12-16.

Conoidasida